Craig Webster (born 23 November 1957) is a Canadian speed skater. He competed in three events at the 1980 Winter Olympics.

References

External links
 

1957 births
Living people
Canadian male speed skaters
Olympic speed skaters of Canada
Speed skaters at the 1980 Winter Olympics
Sportspeople from Regina, Saskatchewan
20th-century Canadian people